Jake Paul vs. Tyron Woodley was a professional boxing match between YouTuber Jake Paul and mixed martial artist Tyron Woodley. The bout took place on August 29, 2021, at the Rocket Mortgage FieldHouse in Cleveland, Ohio.

Background 

It was announced on May 20, 2021, that YouTuber-turned-professional boxer Jake Paul had signed a promotional deal with American television network Showtime, an agreement that would see his next bout aired on the network. His fight against former UFC Welterweight Champion Tyron Woodley was announced on July 12, 2021, with the venue and date set to be in Paul's hometown of Cleveland on August 29, 2021.

Prior to the bout, Paul had compiled a record of 3–0 (3 KOs) as a professional boxer, and was coming off a first-round technical knockout victory on April 17, 2021 against former mixed martial artist Ben Askren, who similar to Woodley had also previously competed in the UFC. For his part, Woodley made his debut as a professional boxer against Paul, and had most recently competed as a mixed martial artist on March 27, 2021, at UFC 260, when he suffered a first-round submission defeat against Vicente Luque. The defeat against Luque was Woodley's fourth consecutive loss as a mixed martial artist.

Fight card

Broadcasting

Fight purses
According to the Ohio State Athletic Commission, both Paul and Woodley earned an official purse of $2,000,000. These figures don't include any additional bonuses or PPV profits.

Guaranteed base purses
 Jake Paul ($2,000,000) vs. Tyron Woodley ($2,000,000)
 Amanda Serrano ($75,000) vs. Yamileth Mercado ($45,000)
 Daniel Dubois ($100,000) vs. Joe Cusumano ($111,000)
 Montana Love ($60,000) vs. Ivan Baranchyk ($60,000)
 Tommy Fury ($15,000) vs. Anthony Taylor ($40,000)
 Charles Conwell ($80,000) vs. Juan Carlos Rubio ($20,000)

Rematch

After the match, Jake Paul made a bet with Woodley that if he got the tattoo, they would have a rematch, Woodley later got the tattoo on his middle finger, and Jake responded with a piece of paper saying "I Love You Too." However, Paul instead called out Tommy Fury to a fight.

On October 29, 2021, it was announced that Jake was going to fight Tommy Fury. However, on December 6, it was announced that Fury pulled out due to a rib injury, and Tyron Woodley stepped in his place for a rematch.

References

External links 

Boxing matches
2021 in boxing
2021 in sports in Ohio
August 2021 sports events in the United States
Boxing in Ohio
Boxing on Showtime
Events in Cleveland
Pay-per-view boxing matches
Sports competitions in Cleveland
Crossover boxing events